Cervati is an Italian mountain of the Province of Salerno, Campania.

Geography
The mountain is located in the north-western side of the municipality of Sanza, close to the forest area of Pruno. It is the source of the river Bussento.

With 1,898 amsl it is the highest mountain of Cilento, followed by Panormo (part of Alburni range, 1,742 amsl), Faiatella (1,710) and Gelbison (1,705). It is also the second highest mountain of Campania, after the Monte Miletto of Matese (2,050), located partly in Molise.

See also
Gelbison
Alburni
Stella
Apennine Mountains

References

External links

Mountains of Campania
Mountains of the Apennines
Cilento
One-thousanders of Italy